Kardia Mou Min Anisiheis (Greek: Καρδιά Μου Μην Ανησυχείς, English: Do not worry my heart) is an album by Antonis Remos. It was released in May 2002 and was the best selling album of the year selling more than 150,000 copies and was certified 3× Platinum. In Cyprus the album sold more than 12,000 copies and was certified 2× Platinum.

Promotion
in December 2001, a double-a side cd-single was released with the singles Ela Na Me Telioseis and Den Eho Pou Na Pao. 
In winter 2002-2003 Remos appeared with Alkistis Protopsalti performing most of the songs of his album.
The album was re-released in May 2003, featuring remixes and the duet with Alkistis Protopsalti S' Agapo which was the second single from her own album Pes Mou Thalassa which was released in December 2002.

Track listing
 Kardia mou min anisiheis (Do Not Worry My Heart)
 Pes mou ti zitas (Tell Me What Are You Asking For)
 Ekripsa To Prosopo Mou (I Hid My Face)
 Den Eho Pou Na Pao (I Have Nowhere To Go)
 Tremo (I'm Trembling)
 Ela na me teleiosis (Come To Finish Me Off)
 Ti Sou 'Ho Kani; (What Have I Done To You?)
 Paradehome (I Admit) 
 Den teliosame (We're Not Done)
 S' Agapo...Ine Aplo (I Love You, It's Simple)
 Savvatovrada (Saturday Nights)
 Mi Me Rotae Kanis (Don't Anyone Ask Me)
 Arrostimeno Mou Mialo (My Sick Mind)
 Meta Ap' Ola Auta (After All This)
 S' Ekdikithika (I Took My Revenge)
Re-released Edition bonus tracks
 Den teleiosame (Remixes by Remee)
 Kardia mou min anisiheis (Galleon Radio mix)
 S' Agapo (Alkistis Protopsalti featuring Antonis Remos)

Singles
Ela Na Me Telioseis
-The first single and first video of the album. Was released in December 2001 in a double-a cd single with "Olos O Kosmos Ise Esi". The cd-single was certified double Platinum.
Den Eho Pou Na Pao
-Second single off the album. Was released in December 2001 in a double-a cd single with "Ela Na Me Telioseis". The cd-single was certified double Platinum.
Kardia Mou Min Anisihis 
-Third single off the album, released just prior to the release of the album in Spring 2002. A cd-single was also released featuring various remixes.
Tremo
-Fourth single and second video clip off the album. Released in summer 2002.
Ekripsa To Prosopo Mou
-Fifth single and third video clip off the album. Released in Autumn 2002.
Savvatovrada
-Sixth single and forth (and final) video clip off the album. Released in February 2003.
Den Teliosame
-Seventh and final single off the album released in May 2003. A cd-single featuring remixes was also released at the same time.

also included on the re-release edition of the album:
S' Agapo - Alikistis Protopsalti featuring Antonis Remos
-The second single off Alkistis Protopsalti album Pes Mou Thalassa released in December 2002. It was included in the re-release of Kardia Mou Min Anisiheis in May 2003.

References

2002 albums
Antonis Remos albums